Edward Alfred George Ware (17 September 1906 – September 1976) was an English professional footballer, best remembered for his time as a wing half in the Football League with Clapton Orient and Brentford.

Career

Chatham Town 
Ware began his career at Rainham and moved to Kent League club Chatham Town in 1925. He won the division title with the club in the 1926–27 season and departed in March 1928.

Brentford 
Ware and Chatham Town teammate Len Ramsell earned moves to Third Division South club Brentford in March 1928. Ware quickly became a first team regular at wing half and his "never-say-die attitude" won him plaudits from the Brentford supporters. Ware was also a part of the team which was promoted as champions to the Second Division in the 1932–33 season. Ware departed Griffin Park at the end of the 1932–33 season, after making 102 appearances for the club.

Later years 
Ware signed for Third Division South club Clapton Orient in August 1933 and made 106 league appearances for the Os, scoring three goals. He had a short spell at Third Division South club Swindon Town during the 1936–37 season and made five appearances. Ware joined Third Division North club Crewe Alexandra in 1937 and made league 62 appearances before the breakout of the Second World War in 1939 brought his career to an end.

Honours 
Chatham Town
 Kent League: 1926–27
Brentford
Football League Third Division South: 1932–33

Career statistics

References

1906 births
1976 deaths
Sportspeople from Chatham, Kent
Footballers from Kent
English footballers
Association football wing halves
Brentford F.C. players
Chatham Town F.C. players
Leyton Orient F.C. players
Swindon Town F.C. players
Crewe Alexandra F.C. players
English Football League players
Kent Football League (1894–1959) players